Dolichernis chloroleuca is a moth of the family Roeslerstammiidae first described by Edward Meyrick in 1891. It is endemic to New Zealand.

References

Roeslerstammiidae
Moths of New Zealand
Taxa named by Edward Meyrick
Endemic fauna of New Zealand
Moths described in 1891
Endemic moths of New Zealand